Yong Peng bread, or also known as Hock Chew style bread, is a type of bread baked by the Chinese people of Yong Peng. It is a type of traditional bread, in round shape, baked with yeasts, and comes in 2 varieties. The plain sweetened version is the mainstream type, while the sesame type is the other type. This bread is very unusual because it is still being baked and produced using traditional methods. Often wrapped in thin plastic and newspaper, it does not have any labels, nor any nutritional and calorie contents. It can be kept for a very long timely by storing it in a freezer.

See also
 List of Chinese bakery products

References

 https://web.archive.org/web/20140106031825/http://malaysiafactbook.com/Yong_Peng

Chinese breads
Malaysian breads